Gareca is a surname. Notable people with the surname include:
Leandro Gareca (born 1991), Bolivian footballer
Ricardo Gareca (born 1958), Argentine football manager